Mike E. Briggs (born January 23, 1959, in Fresno, California) is an American politician from California and a member of the Republican Party (GOP). Briggs was elected to the Fresno City Council in 1994, succeeding Brian Setencich, who resigned a month before his term ended to take his seat in the California State Assembly. Briggs became the second Fresno City Councilman in history to rise to a higher office when he won election to the California State Assembly in 1998 from the Fresno-based 29th district, succeeding Chuck Poochigian, who made a successful run for the California State Senate.

At the end of his second term, Briggs decided to run for the newly created 21st congressional district rather than to seek reelection to the legislature.  Former Fresno mayor and now Assemblyman Jim Patterson entered the race, dividing the vote in the Fresno County portion of the district, delivering the seat to Tulare County candidate Devin Nunes who holds the seat to this day.

References

1.^ California Journal Vol. XXVII, No.3 (February 2002) "Special Election Issue:  Complete Ballot Analysis".  StateNet Publications, February 2002.

2.^ Vassar, Alex; Shane Meyers (2007). "Mike Briggs, Republican". JoinCalifornia.com. Retrieved on October 17, 2008

External links
JoinCalifornia, Election History for the State of California

1959 births
Living people
Republican Party members of the California State Assembly
People from Fresno, California
California city council members
21st-century American politicians